Nicole Fares is a Lebanese academic and translator. She obtained a bachelor's degree in translation and interpretation from AUST in Beirut. She then obtained an M.F.A in literary translation and a Ph.D. in comparative literature and cultural studies. from the University of Arkansas. 

Fares has translated novels, short stories, and poetry from Arabic to English. Her book length translations include:

 32, by Sahar Mandour. Longlisted for the Banipal Prize for Arabic Literary Translation, 2016.
 Jerusalem Stands Alone, by Mahmoud Shukair.
 No One May Remain, by Haitham Hussein.
 Vienna, by Sahar Mandour.
 From Amuda to Amuda, by Siruan H. Hussein.
 In Gaddafi's Clutches, by Ahmed Vall Dine.

Her translations have also appeared in World Literature Today (2014), Jadaliyya (2013), Alchemy Journal of Translation (2013), and others. Her contributions on literature theory and cultural studies include Brave New World: Critical Insights (Salem Press, 2014). and Inclusion and Exclusion: Arab Immigrants and Belonging in Europe , AUC Press, Constructions of Masculinity in the Middle East and North Africa: Literature, Film, and National Discourse. Sep. 2020. Print.

See also
List of Arabic-English translators

References

External links 
 
 Profile in World Literature Today
 Profile in Public Pool
 Profile in Words Without Borders

Arabic–English translators
Writers on the Middle East
Year of birth missing (living people)
Living people